Mountain View High School is a public high school in Stafford, Virginia, United States, for students in grades nine through twelve. It is part of Stafford County Public Schools.

Demographics 
The demographic breakdown of the 2,047 students enrolled in the 2020–21 school year was:
Male - 50.46%
Female - 49.54%
Native American/Alaskan - 0.24%
Asian - 2.93%
Black - 11.48%
Hispanic - 18.22%
Native Hawaiian/Pacific Islander - 0.34%
White - 59.41%
Multiracial - 7.38%

18.1% of the students were eligible for free or reduced-price lunches.

Athletics

Cheerleading
Cross Country
Track and Field
Field Hockey
Football
Golf 
Volleyball
Gymnastics
Swimming
Wrestling
Baseball
Basketball
Lacrosse
Soccer
Softball
Indoor Track
Marching Band 
MCJROTC

Notable alumni
DaeSean Hamilton - Denver Broncos wide receiver
Olumide Olamigoke - Olympian

References

Public high schools in Virginia
Stafford County Public Schools
Educational institutions established in 2005
2005 establishments in Virginia